Lake Almanor Country Club is a census-designated place (CDP) in Plumas County, California, United States. The population was 419 at the 2010 census, down from 847 at the 2000 census. The ZIP code for the CDP is 96137.

Geography
Lake Almanor Country Club is located on the shoreline of the Lake Almanor Peninsula, at  (40.248171, -121.147520).

Demographics

2010
The 2010 United States Census reported that Lake Almanor Country Club had a population of 419. The racial makeup of Lake Almanor Country Club was 406 (96.9%) White, 2 (0.5%) African American, 2 (0.5%) Native American, 1 (0.2%) Asian, 0 (0.0%) Pacific Islander, 2 (0.5%) from other races, and 6 (1.4%) from two or more races. Hispanic or Latino of any race were 8 persons (1.9%).

The Census reported that 419 people (100% of the population) lived in households, 0 (0%) lived in non-institutionalized group quarters, and 0 (0%) were institutionalized.

There were 217 households, out of which 14 (6.5%) had children under the age of 18 living in them, 153 (70.5%) were opposite-sex married couples living together, 5 (2.3%) had a female householder with no husband present, 2 (0.9%) had a male householder with no wife present.  There were 5 (2.3%) unmarried opposite-sex partnerships, and 1 (0.5%) same-sex married couples or partnerships. 50 households (23.0%) were made up of individuals, and 27 (12.4%) had someone living alone who was 65 years of age or older. The average household size was 1.93.  There were 160 families (73.7% of all households); the average family size was 2.22.

The population was spread out, with 21 people (5.0%) under the age of 18, 9 people (2.1%) aged 18 to 24, 27 people (6.4%) aged 25 to 44, 145 people (34.6%) aged 45 to 64, and 217 people (51.8%) who were 65 years of age or older.  The median age was 65.8 years. For every 100 females, there were 103.4 males.  For every 100 females age 18 and over, there were 105.2 males.

The homeowner vacancy rate was 3.0%; the rental vacancy rate was 35.9%.  372 people (88.8% of the population) lived in owner-occupied housing units and 47 people (11.2%) lived in rental housing units.

2000
As of the census of 2000, there were 847 people, 399 households, and 314 families residing in the CDP. The racial makeup of the CDP was 96.58% White, 0.12% African American, 1.53% Native American, 0.71% Asian, 0.12% from other races, and 0.94% from two or more races. Hispanic or Latino of any race were 1.06% of the population.

There were 399 households, out of which 12.0% had children under the age of 18 living with them, 74.4% were married couples living together, 2.3% had a female householder with no husband present, and 21.1% were non-families. 16.5% of all households were made up of individuals, and 8.3% had someone living alone who was 65 years of age or older.  The average household size was 2.12 and the average family size was 2.34.

In the CDP, the population was spread out, with 11.9% under the age of 18, 2.1% from 18 to 24, 10.2% from 25 to 44, 39.3% from 45 to 64, and 36.5% who were 65 years of age or older.  The median age was 60 years. For every 100 females, there were 106.6 males.  For every 100 females age 18 and over, there were 101.1 males.

The median income for a household in the CDP was $46,643, and the median income for a family was $50,855. Males had a median income of $46,071 versus $23,214 for females. The per capita income for the CDP was $28,722.  About 6.2% of families and 11.3% of the population were below the poverty line, including 43.9% of those under age 18 and none of those age 65 or over.

Politics

References

External links
LACC official website

Census-designated places in Plumas County, California
Census-designated places in California